The Vix Grave is a burial mound near the village of Vix in northern Burgundy. The broader site is a prehistoric Celtic complex from the Late Hallstatt and Early La Tène periods, consisting of a fortified settlement and several burial mounds.

The grave of the Lady of Vix, dating to circa 500 BC, had never been disturbed and thus contained remarkably rich grave offerings.  Known in French as the Trésor de Vix, these included a great deal of jewellery and the "Vix krater", the largest known metal vessel from Western classical antiquity, being 1.63 m (5'4") in height.

Location 

The sites are located near the village of Vix, about 6 km north of Châtillon-sur-Seine, in the department of Côte-d'Or, in northeastern Burgundy. It was the site of a fortified Celtic settlement, or oppidum. To the southeast of the hill, there was a 42-hectare necropolis with graves ranging from the Late Bronze Age via the Hallstatt Culture to Late La Tène. Other finds indicate activity up to Late Antiquity.

During the sixth and fifth centuries BC, the Vix (or Mont Lassois) settlement appears to have controlled a major trading node, where the Seine, an important riverine transport route linking eastern and western France, crossed the land route leading from the Mediterranean to northern Europe. Additionally, Vix is at the centre of an agriculturally rich plain.

History of discovery 

Discovery of archaeological material in the area, originally by a locally based amateur, began in April 1930. Increasingly systematic work throughout the following decades revealed thousands of pottery sherds, fibulae, jewellery, and other bronze and iron finds. The burial mound with the krater was excavated in early 1953 by René Joffroy. In 1991 new archaeological research on and around Mont Lassois began under the direction of Bruno Chaume. Since 2001 a programme of research titled “Vix et son environnement” began, uniting the resources of several universities.

The oppidum of Mont Lassois

Fortifications and architecture

Excavation of the settlement on the summit of Mont Lassois revealed extensive fortifications, with ditches and walls up to 8 m thick. The walls were built in the Pfostenschlitzmauer technique, but also yielded nails of the type common in murus gallicus walls. Excavation inside the enclosure revealed a variety of buildings, including post houses, pit dwellings, hearths, and storage units built on stilts. Geophysical work shows a large planned settlement, with a central, north–south axis and several phases of buildings.

The "Palace of the Lady of Vix"

In 2006, a remarkable architectural unit was discovered at the centre of the site. It is a large complex with five large buildings, the main one measuring 35 by 22 m, with an estimated interior height of at least 15 m: the dimensions of a modern church. The large hall had an apse at the back and a front porch in antis. Overall, the central unit resembles the megaron complex of early Greek architecture. Such a find is unprecedented in early Celtic Europe. Finds suggested domestic use or feasting uses. The structure has been described as the "Palace" of the Lady of Vix (Palais de la Dame de Vix). According to Chaume (2011): "The interior space of about 500 m² is divided into three rooms of unequal size. This achievement demonstrates a mastery of geometry and carpentry capable of freeing up vast interior spaces". Geomagnetic surveying has revealed another large apsidal building in a large walled area at the foot of Mont Lassois, on the other side of the river Seine. The building is of similar size and design to those on the Mont Lassois plateau and has also been described as a 'palatial' building. All six large buildings have an identical east-west orientation with their main entrances facing towards the sunrise in the east. This configuration may have been chosen for symbolic rather than practical reasons.

Finds

The many individual finds from the Lassois oppidum clearly demonstrate the settlement's long and wide-ranging trade contacts, as well as its own role as an economic centre. The most common finds are shards of pottery, with more than 40,000 recorded to date. Many are local products, decorated with simple geometric motifs (checkerboard patterns) and occasional depictions of animals. There also have been finds of imported Attic black figure vases from Greece. Many amphorae and bowls could be identified as coming from the contemporary Greek-settled areas of southern France. The amphorae had been used for transporting wine.

Jewellery included fibulae, commonly decorated with amber or coral, earrings, beads, slate bracelets, and rings. Glass ornaments also were found. Some small bronze figurines found are probably of Mediterranean origin. Little weaponry has been found as yet, the majority of it projectiles and axes.

Status
Mont Lassois has all the features of a high-status settlement: large fortifications, the presence of a citadel and a lower town, rare and fine imported materials, as well as numerous rich burial mounds in the vicinity.

The burial mounds

The 1953 Vix Grave 

The burial of "the Lady of Vix" took place around 500 B.C. Although decomposition of the organic contents of the grave was nearly total, the gender of the individual buried has been interpreted as female: she is accompanied by many items of jewellery, but no weaponry. Her social status is not clear and other than "Lady," names such as, Queen, Princess, or Priestess of Vix have all been used in various articles involving conjecture. There can be no doubt of her high status, as indicated by the large amounts of jewellery. She was between 30 years and 35 years old at the time of her death.

Burial and grave goods

The inhumation burial was placed in a 4m x 4m rectangular wooden chamber underneath a mound or tumulus of earth and stone which originally measured 42m in diameter and 5m in height.

Her body was laid in the freestanding box of a cart, or chariot, the wheels of which had been detached and placed beside it. Only its metal parts have survived. Her jewellery included a 480 gram 24-carat gold torc, a bronze torc, six fibulae, six slate bracelets, plus a seventh bracelet made of amber beads.

The grave also contained an assemblage of imported objects from Italy and the Greek world, all of them associated with the preparation of wine. They included the famous krater (see below), a silver phiale (shallow bowl, sometimes seen as a local product), an Etruscan bronze oinochoe (wine jug), and several drinking cups from Etruria and Attica. One of the latter was dated as c. 525 BC and represents the latest firmly dated find in the grave. It thus provides the best evidence, a terminus post quem for its date. The vessels probably were placed on wooden tables or benches that did not survive.

The Vix krater

The largest and most famous of the finds from the burial is an elaborately decorated bronze volute krater of 1.63 m (5'4") height and over 200 kg (450 lbs) weight. Kraters were vessels for mixing wine and water, common in the Greek world, and usually made of clay. The Vix krater has become an iconic object representing both the wealth of early Celtic burials and the art of Late Archaic Greek bronze work.
 The krater was made of seven or more individual pieces with alphabetical markings, indicating that it probably was transported to Burgundy in pieces and assembled in situ.
 The vase proper, made of a single sheet of hammered bronze, weighs about 60 kg. Its bottom is rounded, its maximum diameter is 1.27 m, and its capacity is 1,100 litres. Its walls are only 1 mm to 1.3 mm thick. The krater was found crushed by the weight of the tumulus material above it. It had telescoped completely: the handles were found at the same level as the base. It was restored after excavation.
 Its foot is made of a single moulded piece, its diameter is 74 cm, its weight 20.2 kg. It received the rounded bottom of the main vase and ensured its stability. It is decorated with stylised plant motifs.
 The three handles, supported by rampant lionesses, weighed about 46 kg each. Each is a 55 cm high volute, each is elaborately decorated with a grimacing gorgon, a common motif on contemporary Greek bronzes.
 A frieze of hoplites decorates the neck of the vessel, which is made of a bronze ring inserted into the main vase and supporting the handles. It depicts eight chariots, each drawn by four horses and conducted by a charioteer (depicted smaller than the hoplites for reasons of space), each is followed by a single fully armed hoplite on foot. The frieze is an important example of early Greek bronze relief art, which has rarely survived.
 The lid was a hammered bronze sheet, weighing 13.8 kg and shaped to fit the krater's opening. It is concave and perforated by multiple holes, probably because it also served as a strainer for purifying wine. A protrusion at its centre supports a 19 cm statuette of moulded bronze, depicting a woman with one outstretched arm, which once may have held some object such as a plastinx. She wears a peplos, the body-length Ancient Greek garment worn by women, and her head is covered by a veil. The statuette appears of a somewhat older style than figures on the rest of the vessel.

Significance

The enormous variety of apparently Mediterranean imports indicates wide-ranging trade connections; in particular, the Mediterranean material might have come to Vix with Greek or Etruscan traders. The wealth of imported luxury goods at Vix is, so far, unique in La Tène Europe. It has been suggested that the krater, the largest known Greek bronze vessel, should be seen in a context of high-status gift exchange connected with the trade of wine from the Mediterranean for raw materials from northern Europe.

Exhibition and reconstruction
A reconstruction of the grave and the original finds are on display in the museum at Châtillon-sur-Seine.

Further tumuli 
Apart from this woman's grave (mound I), there are five further known large burial mounds in the area. Three of them have been excavated so far.
 Mound II had a diameter of 33 m; its central chamber contained an urn with cremated human remains, dated by accompanying finds to c. 850 BC.
 The mound of La Butte probably dates to the mid-sixth century. As in its famous neighbouring grave, it contained a woman laid in a cart, or chariot, accompanied by two iron axes and a gold bracelet.
 A third mound, at La Garenne, was destroyed in 1846. It, too, contained a cart, as well as an Etruscan bronze bowl with four griffin or lioness handles. It is not known whether it contained skeletal remains.

Statues
In 1994, fragments of two stone statues, a warrior, and a figure of a woman, were discovered in a small enclosure.

Significance
In the area, as elsewhere in Central and Western Europe, the early Iron Age led to changes in social organisation, including a marked tendency toward the development of social hierarchies. It seems that at the top of these hierarchies was an aristocracy that had developed in the context of the increasingly important trade in iron ore and iron. Whether they really were "princesses" or "princes" in a modern sense (i.e., a noble or religious aristocracy) or simply represented an economic or mercantile elite is still the subject of much discussion.

Evidence for these changed social conditions is seen in the richly equipped graves of this period, which stand in sharp contrast to the preceding habit of uniform simple urn burials. It is also seen in the changing settlement patterns of the region. Whereas large open settlements had previously served as central places, smaller enclosed settlements developed, often in locally prominent locations (so called manors or princely sites). Several of these sites are known from Late Hallstatt and Early La Tène Europe, for example, the burials at Hochdorf and Magdalenenberg, the Heuneburg settlement and the Glauberg settlement and burial complex.

Iron ores were far more widespread than the rarer materials needed to produce the previously dominant bronze: copper, but especially, tin. Thus, economic success ceased to be determined simply by access to the raw materials, but started to depend on infrastructure and trade. The increasing economic surplus in well-situated places was invested in representative settlements (and fortifications), jewellery, and expensive imported luxury materials, a differentiation not previously possible.

Gallery

See also
 Hochdorf Chieftain's Grave
 Graves of Sainte-Colombe-sur-Seine
 Lavau Grave
 Heuneburg
 Glauberg
 Hohenasperg
 Ipf (mountain)
 Burgstallkogel
 Alte Burg
 Vorstengraf (Oss)
 Grächwil
 Grafenbühl grave
 Reinheim grave
 Princely Grave of Rodenbach
 Lingons
 Oppidum of Manching

References

Bibliography
 René Joffroy : Le Trésor de Vix (Côte d’Or). Presses Universitaires de France, Paris 1954.
 René Joffroy: Das Oppidum Mont Lassois, Gemeinde Vix, Dép Côte-d’Or. In: Germania 32, 1954, pp. 59–65.
 René Joffroy: L’Oppidum de Vix et la civilisation Hallstattienne finale dans l’Est de la France. Paris 1960.
 René Joffroy: Le Trésor de Vix. Histoire et portée d’une grande découverte. Fayard, Paris 1962.
 René Joffroy: Vix et ses trésors. Tallandier, Paris 1979.
 Franz Fischer: Frühkeltische Fürstengräber in Mitteleuropa. Antike Welt 13, Sondernummer. Raggi-Verl., Feldmeilen/Freiburg. 1982.
 Bruno Chaume: Vix et son territoire à l’Age du fer: fouilles du mont Lassois et environnement du site princier. Montagnac 2001, .
 Bruno Chaume, Walter Reinhard: Fürstensitze westlich des Rheins, in: Archäologie in Deutschland 1, 2002, pp. 9–14.
 Claude Rolley (ed.): La tombe princière de Vix, Paris 2003, 
 Vix, le cinquantenaire d’une découverte. Dossier d’Archéologie N° 284, Juin 2003.
 Bruno Chaume/Tamara Grübel et al.: Vix/Le mont Lassois. Recherches récentes sur le complexe aristocratique. In: Bourgogne, du Paléolithique au Moyen Âge, Dossiers d’Archéologie N° Hors Série 11, Dijon 2004, pp. 30–37.

External links

 An unfinished trend: towards urbanisation in Celtic regions north of the Alps (575-450 BC) (Brun et al. 2021) Detailed information and digital reconstructions of the Mont Lassois oppidum.
 Entre l’État et la chefferie simple: Le complexe aristocratique de Vix/le mont Lassois (Chaume et al. 2021) More information including digital reconstructions of the 'aristocratic complex' on Mont Lassois.
 Vix (Côte-d’Or) and the emergence of Celtics principalities: the port hypothesis and the concept of port of trade (Chaume et al. 2020) Port facilities at Mont Lassois, including digital reconstructions.
 Crossing the Alps: Early Urbanism between Northern Italy and Central Europe, 900-400 BC (2020)
 Vix museum: The Vix Treasure
 Vix museum: Excavations of the Vix Grave and Mont Lassois oppidum
 Archaeologie en Bourgogne: Vix, Une Residence Princiere au Temps de la Splendeur d'Athenes (2011)
 Der Schatz im Keltengrab (2014) German-language documentary, including digital reconstructions of Mont Lassois and other sites from the Hallstatt era.
 A graffito in Lepontic characters from the 5th century BC in the Gallic necropolis of Montagnesson at Bergères-les-Vertus (Marne). (Olivier 2010)

 

Historic and archaeological sites in Burgundy
Celtic archaeological sites
Prehistoric sites in France
Pre-Roman Gaul
Tumuli in France
Celtic art
Ancient Greek metalwork
Chariot burials
Individual vases
Ancient Celtic metalwork